The Chewuch River is a river in the U.S. state of Washington.

Its name comes from the word /cwáx/ [čwáx] in the Columbia-Moses language meaning "creek".

The river valley was also the site of the Thirty Mile Fire which killed four fire fighters in July 2001.

Course
The Chewuch River originates in the Cascade Range northeast of Remmel Mountain at the junction of Remmel Creek and Cathedral Creek. It flows generally south to join the Methow River at Winthrop. The Methow empties into the Columbia River. Tributaries of the Chewuch River include Andrews Creek, Lake Creek, Eightmile Creek, and Cub Creek.

See also
 List of rivers of Washington
List of tributaries of the Columbia River

References

Rivers of Washington (state)
Rivers of Okanogan County, Washington